Nadine Nabil Schtakleff (born 9 February 1985) is a Lebanese former footballer who played as a midfielder. She represented Lebanon internationally.

Early life 
Schtakleff was born Beirut, Lebanon, and moved to the United Arab Emirates when she was a few weeks old. She began playing football aged six. Schtakleff went to school in Abu Dhabi, and did a finance degree in Lebanon, before going on to work as a banker.

Club career 
Schtakleff played for Lebanese club Ansar since their formation in 2007, and for the Abu Dhabi Country Club in the United Arab Emirates 2009. In 2011, she played for Emirati side King Raiders in the National Amateur Football Championship, helping them win the league title after scoring both goals in a 2–0 win in the final against Falcons.

In 2009, she worked as liaison officer of New Zealand club Auckland City, helping the team as an Arabic-to-English translator ahead of the club's game against Emirati club Al-Ahli in the 2009 FIFA Club World Cup.

International career
Schtakleff represented Lebanon at the 2014 AFC Women's Asian Cup qualification in 2013, where she played three games and scored two goals against Kuwait. She was also the team captain for a few years.

Career statistics

International
Scores and results list Lebanon's goal tally first, score column indicates score after each Schtakleff goal.

Honours
King Raiders
 National Amateur Football Championship: 2011

Lebanon
 WAFF Women's Championship third place: 2007

See also
 List of Lebanon women's international footballers

References

External links
 
 

1985 births
Living people
Footballers from Beirut
Lebanese emigrants to the United Arab Emirates
Lebanese women's footballers
Women's association football midfielders
Al Ansar FC (women) players
Lebanese Women's Football League players
Lebanon women's international footballers
Lebanese expatriate women's footballers
Lebanese expatriate sportspeople in New Zealand